STEM.org is an American multinational education company based in Southfield, Michigan. The organization was founded in 2001 by Andrew B. Raupp under the name "Initiative Science," despite conducting outreach programs in all STEM fields (previously SMET). By 2014, STEM.org had been recognized by the United States Senate for having worked with over 100,000 students, through partnerships with schools involving collaborative educational activities. In K-12 education, STEM.org has worked with private, public, and charter schools.

Services
STEM.org’s services include curriculum evaluation and development, STEM-credentialing of people and programs, and production of various STEM-related content through public-private consulting partnerships. The organization has STEM-accredited schools through professional development training events, which involved school educators learning pedagogical methodology.

History

Origin (2000-2001)
STEM.org began as a science-based field trip in southwest Detroit, Michigan. Returning to the neighborhood where he lived as a child, Andrew B. Raupp took part in a community cleaning and gardening project in the summer of 2000. In doing so, Raupp connected with his old classmates’ younger siblings, whom he taught how to grow vegetable gardens while they joined him in the project. As a reward, Raupp rented a bus and took the children on trips to a local natural area, where they learned about various science concepts. After the summer project ended, schools in southwest Detroit hired Raupp to conduct more educational programs.

Growth (2001-2014)
Andrew B. Raupp founded the organization in 2001, originally working with 50 K-12 students. By December 2014, STEM.org grew to having worked with over 142,500 K-12 students.

Evolution (2014-2016)
As of 2016, STEM.org is a multimillion-dollar pedagogics firm that has worked with international schools in Jordan and Jamaica, as well as over 1,700 schools in the US. The organization has shifted focus from direct student programming to creating sustainable change in education by employing experts in curriculum development and working with policymakers on vertical and horizontal platforms.

Awards
 2015 – Corp! Magazine, "DiSciTech Award Winner"
 2014 – Southfield Chamber of Commerce, "Southfield Company to Watch"
 2014 – Small Business Administration, "Emerging Leader"
 2013 – Michigan Career Educator & Employer Alliance, "Employer of the Year"

References

External links

Education companies of the United States
Teacher training programs